Savio Oliver Ignatius Rodrigues (born 1976) is an Indian writer, journalist, serial entrepreneur, environmentalist, television presenter and politician from Goa. He is the founder and editor-in-chief of GoaChronicle.com. He is also the Bhartiya Janata Party Goa leader and state spokesperson of the Velim Assembly constituency.

Early and personal life
Savio Oliver Ignatius Rodrigues was born to Ignatius Rosario Rodrigues into a Christian family of Hindu ancestry. He completed his graduation in Bachelor of Arts and Bachelor of Laws (B.A LL.B) (first year) from Government Law College, Mumbai in 2000. On 13 February 2004, He married researcher Myrtle Rodrigues (née Fernandes) through court marriage. Two days later they had an official church marriage, the couple has two daughters, Kaydence and Kianna. He currently resides at Baga, Velim.

Rodrigues spent most of his younger years studying and living in Dubai. He has also completed an online course from Harvard University on the subjects, religion, conflict, and peace and is also currently pursuing a 7-course program on "World Religions Through Their Scriptures" from the same university.

Career
Rodrigues began his career at the age of 20 in the fields of journalism, communications and entrepreneurship. During his early years he built his career in media, environmental sciences and technology in India. His business ventures include GoaChronicle.com, Kaydence Media Ventures, Incubees.com, and Kianna Media Ventures. During its early years, GoaChronicle.com, now owned by Kaydence Media Ventures and a part of ITV Network Group found itself struggling in the state of Goa.

Rodrigues was also a television host of the TV show, The Goa Chronicle Show (2021) which aired on NewsX.

Politics

Rodrigues joined Goa Su-Raj Party and was appointed the party secretary and youth affairs president. He then unsuccessfully contested in the 2014 Indian general election in Goa from the Mormugao (Lok Sabha constituency). Rodrigues later joined the Indian National Congress where he served as a senior leader and vice president of the Goa Congress minority cell. He resigned from the party via Twitter on 17 March 2017.

On 4 January 2022, Rodrigues joined the Bhartiya Janata Party during the presence of Goa unit president, Sadanand Tanavade. He then unsuccessfully contested in the 2022 Goa Legislative Assembly election from the Velim Assembly constituency and lost to AAP candidate, Cruz Silva with a margin of 4,059 votes.

Controversy
On 14 April 2011, Rodrigues filed a petition in the Bombay High Court at Panjim, seeking a ban on the release of the 2011 Hindi-language movie, Dum Maaro Dum, claiming it showed the state of Goa in bad light. He later took objections to the constitution of the seven member committee of the government to examine the movie before its released in theatres.

On 19 April 2011, The court dismissed Rodrigues's petition, allowing the film to be released. Another issue regarding the movie dialogue "Yahaan sharab sasti hai" which was objected by the Goa State Commission For Women was later modified.

Bibliography
Karmic Ishq (2015)
Modi Stole My Mask (2021)

References

Year of birth uncertain
1970s births
Living people
Writers from Goa
People from South Goa district
Businesspeople from Goa
Goan people
Journalists from Goa
Bharatiya Janata Party politicians from Goa
Former members of Indian National Congress
Indian television presenters
Harvard University alumni